The 1936 Ohio State Buckeyes football team represented Ohio State University as a member the Big Ten Conference during the 1936 college football season. Led by third-year head coach Francis Schmidt, the Buckeyes compiled an overall record of 5–3 with a mark of 4–1 in conference play, tying for second place in the Big Ten.

Schedule

1937 NFL draftees

References

Ohio State
Ohio State Buckeyes football seasons
Ohio State Buckeyes football